Polite society may refer to:

The upper class (a euphemism)
Polite society, the etiquette and manners of the upper class
Polite Society, a 1995 novel by Melanie Sumner, winner of that year's Whiting Writers' Award
Polite Society (film), an upcoming British action comedy film